"Just a Little Love" is a song written by Stephen Allen Davis and Dennis Morgan, and recorded by American country music artist Reba McEntire.  It was released in February 1984 as the first single and title track from the album Just a Little Love.  The song reached #5 on the Billboard Hot Country Singles & Tracks chart.

Track list
CD single
"Just A Little Love
"If Your Heart's Not In It (What's In It For Me)

Chart performance

References

1984 singles
Reba McEntire songs
Songs written by Dennis Morgan (songwriter)
Song recordings produced by Norro Wilson
MCA Records singles
Songs written by Stephen Allen Davis
1984 songs